Nedvědice is a market town in Brno-Country District in the South Moravian Region of the Czech Republic. It has about 1,300 inhabitants.

Administrative parts
The village of Pernštejn is an administrative part of Nedvědice.

Geography
It is located in the Upper Svratka Highlands, at the confluence of the rivers Svratka and Nedvědička.

Sights
Nedvědice is known for the Pernštejn Castle, located on a rocky promontory above the Nedvědička.

Notable people
Anton Emil Titl (1809–1882), Austrian composer and conductor

References

Populated places in Brno-Country District
Market towns in the Czech Republic